Alexandros Galitsios (born 20 April 1993) is a Greek professional footballer who plays as a centre-back for Gamma Ethniki club Iraklis Larissa.

Club career
Galitsios started playing with the team's youth squad, in June 2008. After having several successful appearances in the U-21 championship, he was promoted to the first team in January 2012, having signed a 4,5-years contract. He made his professional debut on 9 May 2012, against Panthrakikos, under manager Michalis Ziogas.

International career
Galitsios is an active international player for Greece U-17 and U-19 teams. He made his international U-19 debut on 3 September 2011, on a friendly match against Sweden.

Personal life
He is the youngest son of the team's former captain and all-time appearances record holder Giannis Galitsios, and brother of Giorgos Galitsios, who has also played in the team for several years and is now playing for Cypriot club Anorthosis.

Honours
Sparta
Gamma Ethniki: 2015–16

Volos
Gamma Ethniki: 2017–18
Football League: 2018–19

References
AEL 1964 FC Official
Professional Contract

External links
 
Debut Interview
Video & Photos on Youtube

1993 births
Living people
Greek footballers
Greece youth international footballers
Greek expatriate footballers
Football League (Greece) players
Delta Ethniki players
Gamma Ethniki players
Cypriot Second Division players
Super League Greece 2 players
Athlitiki Enosi Larissa F.C. players
Tyrnavos 2005 F.C. players
A.E. Sparta P.A.E. players
Trikala F.C. players
P.O. Xylotymbou players
Volos N.F.C. players
Kalamata F.C. players
Greek expatriate sportspeople in Cyprus
Expatriate footballers in Cyprus
Association football central defenders
Footballers from Larissa